Alfauir is a municipality in the comarca of Safor in the Valencian Community, Spain.

Main sights 
Monastery of Sant Jeroni de Cotalba, constructed between the 14th and 18th centuries.
Church of the Mare de Déu del Roser, 20th century.
Palma Castle, 11th century.

People
 Salvador Cardona, a professional road racing cyclist. In 1929 he became the first Spanish road bicycle racer to win a stage in Tour de France.
 Nicolás Borrás, a Spanish Renaissance painter and monk of the Monastery of Sant Jeroni de Cotalba.
 Antonio Sancho de Benevento, a silversmith artist of the Spanish Renaissance and monk of the Monastery of Sant Jeroni de Cotalba.

See also 
 Monastery of Sant Jeroni de Cotalba
 Route of the Monasteries of Valencia
 Route of the Borgias
 Route of the Valencian classics

References

External links 

Municipalities in the Province of Valencia
Safor
Route of the Borgias